Iris narzykulovi a species of praying mantis found in Tadschikistan.

See also
List of mantis genera and species

References

Tarachodidae
Mantodea of Asia
Insects of Central Asia
Insects described in 1960